Ololygon strigilata is a species of frog in the family Hylidae.
It is endemic to Brazil.
Its natural habitats are rivers, freshwater marshes, and intermittent freshwater marshes.

References

strigilata
Endemic fauna of Brazil
Amphibians described in 1824
Taxonomy articles created by Polbot